The Stradella Bass System (sometimes called standard bass) is a buttonboard layout equipped on the bass side of many accordions, which uses columns of buttons arranged in a circle of fifths; this places the principal major chords of a key (I, IV and V) in three adjacent columns.

Etymology
The name is from Stradella, a town and commune of the Oltrepò Pavese in the Province of Pavia in the northern Italian region of Lombardy, once an important center for the production of accordions.

Layout

Each bass note, and each pitch in a chord, is usually sounded simultaneously in multiple octaves. Larger accordions offer some control over the voicing with register switches.

In modern accordions, each chord button sounds three individual pitches. Early accordions sounded four pitches for the seventh and diminished chords.  Modern Stradella systems omit the 5th from these two chords, allowing for more versatility. For example, an augmented seventh chord can be created by using the dominant seventh chord button and adding an augmented 5th from the right-hand manual or from one of the bass or counterbass buttons.

In most Russian layouts the diminished seventh chord row is moved by one button (so, for example, the C diminished seventh chord is where the F diminished seventh would be in a standard Stradella layout), so it is more easily reached with the forefinger.

As the buttons are on the front face and cannot be seen by the player, a small depression, hole or bump is made on the central C button in the root row, as well as on other selected root-bass buttons, such as the A and E, which are four buttons away in either direction.

Notation

In staff notation written for Stradella bass, notes below the center of the bass-clef staff are bass notes, and notes above the center of the staff usually indicate chord buttons. The first instance of a chord is labeled M, m, 7, or D (or d, or dim) to a signify major, minor, dominant seventh or diminished seventh, with the label applying to subsequent similar chords, until a different type of chord occurs or a new system (line) of music begins.

Within this convention, the written octave for bass and chord notes is arbitrary. The Stradella system does not have buttons for higher and lower octaves. Different accordions contain sets of reeds in different octaves, which may also be activated or muted by the accordion's register switches. For example:

As written:

As sounded, with one possible octave voicing:

Bass notes to be played on the major third (counterbass) row are often indicated by repurposed "tenuto" lines below the notes (as in the E bass note in the example above), or underlined note names or numbers.

Single-note bass lines are often labeled "B.S." (bass solo or bassi soli), especially when they extend above the middle of the staff.

Fingering
As with the piano, fingers are numbered 2 to 5, starting with the index finger, mirroring right-hand fingering. As a rule, the thumb, numbered 1, is not used.

Patterns can be played identically in any desired key, changing only the starting position. This is because, unlike a piano keyboard, the Stradella layout is isomorphic—meaning that a given sequence/combination of notes is played with the same relative finger positions and motions in any key. Layouts with 16 or more columns are sufficient to play in any of the 12 keys of the circle of fifths.

Bass and chords
4–3 is a recommended fingering for a bass note and its corresponding major chord (e.g. C–CM–C–CM). For alternate bass with the root and fifth, 4–3–2–3 can be used for major chords (e.g. C–CM–G–CM), 4–2–3–2 for minor and other types of chords (e.g. C–C7–G–C7).

Scales
Scales, runs, and other bass lines are played on the bass note buttons, the row or rows closest to the bellows (root row, optional thirds row, optional minor thirds row).

Major scales
The major scale can be fingered without stretching the hand, playing in any key as r4 r2 t4 r5 / r3 t5 t3 r4 (r = root row, t = thirds row) or, with minimal movement of the index finger, r3 r2 t3 r4 / r2 t4 t2 r3.

Minor scales
A recommended fingering for harmonic minor:

Melodic minor (different ascending and descending):

Register switches
Larger and more expensive accordions may have as many as seven register switches on the bass side, controlling which reed ranks play and thus the octaves and voicing of the bass notes and chords, similar in concept to the treble register switches on the keyboard side. Smaller or simpler accordions may have no bass switches, or a single switch that toggles two settings.

{| class="wikitable"
|-
|+ colspan=7| Bass register switches and reed sets of a typical professional-grade accordion
|-
! colspan=2 rowspan=2| Register switch !! colspan=5| Reed sets
|- align="center"
| SopranoC5–B5 
| AltoC4–B4 
| ContraltoF3–F4 
| TenorC3–B3 
| BassC2–B2
|- align="center"
! Name !! Symbol
| colspan=3| (chords and bass notes) || colspan=2| (bass notes only)
|- align="center"
| soprano || 
|  ||  ||  ||  || 
|- align="center"
| alto || 
|  ||  ||  ||  || 
|- align="center"
| tenor || 
|  ||  ||  ||  || 
|- align="center"
| soft tenor || 
 
|  ||  ||  ||  || 
|- align="center"
| master orbass forte || 

|  ||  ||  ||  || 
|- align="center"
| soft bass orbass piano || 
 
|  ||  ||  ||  || 
|- align="center"
| bass/alto || 
 
|  ||  ||  ||  || 
|}

With the soprano or alto register selected, bass buttons exactly duplicate individual notes from the chords, without the usual added lower (tenor and bass) octaves.

An accordion with one or two register switches on the bass side might provide tenor and master registers, while accordions with additional switches might have larger subsets.

Common configurations 

Versions with 25 columns of buttons, such as on the Russian Tula Bayan, also exist, ranging from E to C , which can play the same reeds, despite there being accordions that can play lower than E1, and potentially as low as C1.

See also
Array system, same circle of fifths system for an mbira
Alternate bass
Free-bass system

Notes

References

Sets of free reeds
Accordion
Isomorphic keyboard layouts